The Wonderful World of Make Believe is an album by American pop singer Johnny Mathis that was released by Mercury Records on July 10, 1964, and described by Greg Adams of Allmusic, who wrote, "The theme is fantasy, from imaginary locations ('Camelot', 'Shangri-La') to fanciful yearnings ('I'm Always Chasing Rainbows', 'When You Wish Upon a Star') to vague, idealized realms ('Beyond the Sea', 'Beyond the Blue Horizon')."

The album debuted on Billboard magazine's Top LP's chart in the issue dated July 25, 1964, and reached number 75 during its 10 weeks there.

This project was released on compact disc for the first time as one of two albums in a two-CD set by Sony Music Entertainment on August 28, 2012, the other album being Mathis's previous studio LP, Tender Is the Night. The Wonderful World of Make Believe was also included in Sony's Mathis box set The Complete Global Albums Collection, which was released on November 17, 2014.

Reception
Adams contrasts the approach of this album to his singles of the period. "Mercury didn't tamper with Mathis's established style on this album (unlike his first singles for the label, which seemed geared toward a younger audience), so the arrangements are in keeping with his Columbia work, if a bit more swirly and ornate as the material seemed to require." He concludes that this project "is strictly an album effort -- no standout single tracks here -- but it's an enticingly dreamy effort and Mathis sings superbly."

Billboard especially appreciated the concept and team at work here: "A fine idea, beautifully performed by Mathis with able support from Allyn Ferguson's arrangements and Jack Feierman's orchestration."

Track listing

Side one
"Camelot" from Camelot (Alan Jay Lerner, Frederick Loewe) – 2:50
"I'm Always Chasing Rainbows" from Oh, Look! (Harry Carroll, Joseph McCarthy) – 3:37
"House of Flowers" from House of Flowers (Harold Arlen, Truman Capote) – 3:36
"Beyond the Sea" (Jack Lawrence, Charles Trenet) – 3:25
"Sky Full of Rainbows" (Bart Howard) – 3:09
"Sands of Time" from Kismet (George Forrest, Robert Wright) – 3:11

Side two
"Shangri-La" (Matty Malneck, Robert Maxwell, Carl Sigman) – 3:30
"Alice in Wonderland" from Alice in Wonderland (Bob Hilliard, Sammy Fain) – 2:46
"Dream, Dream, Dream" (Jimmy McHugh, Mitchell Parish) – 3:09
"The World of Make-Believe" (Jay Livingston, Paul Francis Webster) – 2:43
"When You Wish Upon a Star" from Pinocchio (Leigh Harline, Ned Washington) – 4:21
"Beyond the Blue Horizon" from Monte Carlo (Leo Robin, Richard Whiting) – 2:57

Recording dates

February 7, 1964: "Alice in Wonderland", "Sky Full of Rainbows", "The World of Make-Believe"
February 8, 1964: "Beyond the Sea", "House of Flowers", "I'm Always Chasing Rainbows", "Shangri-La", "When You Wish Upon a Star"
February 10, 1964: "Beyond the Blue Horizon", "Camelot", "Dream, Dream, Dream", "Sands of Time"

Personnel

Johnny Mathis – vocals; producer
Allyn Ferguson – arranger
Jack Feierman – conductor
Bill Putnam – recording engineer
Paul Francis Webster – liner notes

References

Bibliography

1964 albums
Johnny Mathis albums
Mercury Records albums
Albums arranged by Allyn Ferguson
Albums produced by Johnny Mathis